The long-tailed dunnart (Sminthopsis longicaudata) is an Australian dunnart that, like the little long-tailed dunnart, has a tail longer than its body. It is also one of the larger dunnarts at a length from snout to tail of 260–306 mm of which head to anus is 80–96 mm and tail 180–210 mm long. Hind foot size is 18 mm, ear length of 21 mm and with a weight of 15-20 g.

Distribution and habitat
In Western Australia it is known from the Pilbara and eastern coast to the NE goldfields and Gibson desert (Young Ranges) south to the Nullarbor Plain, to central Northern Territory and western South Australia. Its habitat includes Acacia, rocky screes with hummock grass and shrubs, and tall open shrubland and woodlands.

Social organisation and breeding
A nocturnal species, this marsupial has great agility for jumping. When breeding during October–November, it burrows a hole under logs and makes its nests out of grass. The litter is of up to 6 joeys. It is locally considered to be endangered, but the IUCN Red List indicates that it is of least concern.

Diet
It eats invertebrates like ants, beetles and centipedes.

References

Australian National Parks & Wildlife Service - Australian Endangered Species - mammals
Australian National Parks & Wildlife Service - Resource Kit: Endangered Species

External links
Long Tailed Dunnart by Matthew
Australian Biological Resources Study
Long-tailed Dunnart Greeting Card
Sminthopsis longicaudata (long-tailed dunnart)
Northern Territory

Dasyuromorphs
Mammals of Western Australia
Mammals of the Northern Territory
Marsupials of Australia
Mammals described in 1909
Taxa named by Walter Baldwin Spencer